The Banff World Media Festival (formerly known as the Banff World Television Festival) is an international media event held in the Canadian Rockies at the Fairmont Banff Springs Hotel in Banff, Alberta, Canada. The festival is dedicated to world television and digital content and its creation and development, and is owned and operated by Brunico Communications.

As well as honouring excellence in international television, professionals from around the world participate in seminars, master classes, and pitching opportunities. Film directors, screenwriters, and producers from PBS, BBC, NHK, Arte, Channel 4, ABC, Sony Pictures, HBO, CBC, NFB, ICP (Israel Cable Programming), SBS, and many other broadcasters and production companies attend the annual event.

The festival provides a global platform for industry members to discuss and debate, and explore current issues, challenges and trends.

Awards
The festival features an international program competition, the Banff Rockie Awards. Past winners include PBS for The Hobart Shakespeareans and No Direction Home: Bob Dylan, ICP for Aaron Cohen's Debt, BBC and HBO for The Children of Beslan, NHK for Children Full of Life, BBC and WGBH for Bleak House, and Arte for Fellini: I'm a Born Liar.

The awards ceremony also bestows the Sir Peter Ustinov Comedy Award. Past recipients of the award include John Cleese, Dame Edna, Bob Newhart, Martin Short, Tracey Ullman, Kelsey Grammer, Ricky Gervais, Craig Ferguson, Shane Smith, Brent Butt, and Suroosh Alvi.  Jan Randall was music director and Composer for the awards from 1995 to 2007.

See also

 Festivals in Alberta
 List of television festivals

References

External links

Festivals in Banff, Alberta
Film festivals in Alberta
Television festivals
Web awards